North Star House (alternate: Foote Mansion) is a house located roughly a mile south of Grass Valley, Nevada County, northern California. The building served as the superintendent's house for the North Star Mine. Commissioned by Superintendent Arthur De Wint Foote and his wife, Mary Hallock Foote ("Molly"), an author and illustrator, it was designed in 1905 by the architect Julia Morgan. This was her first significant, large-scale, residential project. The house is notable for its relationship to the literary career of Molly Foote and the master architect, Morgan.

Geography
The house is located at 12075 Old Auburn Road, near the Nevada County Fairgrounds. Situated on a  site, the property is on a hillside that overlooks foothills and a valley. To the south is Quail Valley Golf Club.

History
The North Star Mine was the second largest producer of gold during the California Gold Rush. The Footes originally lived on the mine property for 10 years with their three children in a cottage.  When Foote and his wife decided they needed a home to entertain the investors, dignitaries and celebrities that were coming to the Gold Country, they hired Morgan to design it. Built in 1905, it was one of her first projects. While living in the house Mary Foote wrote her lifetime reminiscences which form her published memoirs, A Victorian Gentlewoman in the Far West. From the time of construction to 1968, the residence was occupied by the Foote family.

In 1968, the property was purchased and served as a private religious school for boarding students during the 1970s, and as a school for troubled youths from 1970 through the early 1980s. It attracted youths as far away as Michigan after it became known as a non traditional Christian church. It was operated by a renegade Baptist preacher called Rev. Bill. By the late '70s rumors were circulating about unorthodox dealings with the youths at the school. The school eventually closed. Rev Bill was never heard from again. Local legend says that there was ritualistic practices going on, locking up children and brainwashing them into occult practices. To the locals this place is known as The Devil's Mansion.   Now operated as an event center by a non-profit organization, it is currently the home of the weekly Nevada County Growers Market. The North Star House was the setting for Wallace Stegner’s Pulitzer Prize winning novel, Angle of Repose.

The house eventually became derelict. From the mid-1980s until April 2002, it was owned by Terra Alta Development. During this time Penelope Curtis founded the Julia Morgan Conservancy which began restoration plans for the house. By November 2002, Sandy Sanderson, an Oregon developer, obtained a binding contract on the property. Restoration was begun by the North Star Historic Conservancy after the Nevada County Land Trust hired Bruce Conklin to oversee the site's restoration in 2003.  Listed on the National Register of Historic Places on February 1, 2011, it is still undergoing restoration.

Architecture and fittings
The  mansion, with 22 rooms, is an early example of the California Arts and Crafts style. The style, dubbed the First Bay Tradition, included natural materials and site-sensitive design such as local waste rock from the mine, hand-peeled logs and redwood shingles. Exemplifying Morgan's style, the house features exposed beams, strong horizontal lines, the use of shingles, and earth-toned colors.

The building is oriented west and u-shaped in plan. An entry courtyard is situated on the east side, while a sprawling stone terrace is on the west side. Framed in wood, the walls are of stone masonry at the first level, and redwood shingle sheathing at the second level. The low pitch gable roof features wide overhangs and eyebrow vents, the original wood shingle replaced in 2004 with fireproof composite shingles. The foundation is of quarry stone and cement, while the chimneys are of brick. There are several entry doors which access the living room, library, study, and dining room. Original features, such as doorknobs and light fixtures, are no longer on the property. On the second level, an open air sleeping porch is situated above the terrace.

A courtyard is situated between the building's two wings. A small garage, which was added at the northeast corner of the building ca. 1968, is being removed.

Grounds
The grounds feature a Great Lawn and other distinct areas for community events. There are giant ponderosa pines, sloping lawns, and plantings that date to the late 1800s. The hybridized fruit trees that resulted from Foote's collaboration with Luther Burbank are evidenced in the surrounding heritage orchard.

Historically, the property included hydrangeas, magnolias, and crepe myrtle. There was a fern grove to the south and landscaping to the north included Japanese quince, peonies, cedar, and tulip trees.

See also
National Register of Historic Places listings in Nevada County, California

References

External links

North Star Historic Conservancy

Julia Morgan buildings
Houses in Nevada County, California
Grass Valley, California
Houses completed in 1905
Houses on the National Register of Historic Places in California
National Register of Historic Places in Nevada County, California
1905 establishments in California